The Maculloch Baronetcy, of Myrstoun, was a title in the Baronetage of Nova Scotia.  It was created on 10 August 1664 for Alexander Maculloch.  The title became extinct on the death of the second Baronet in 1697.

Maculloch baronets, of Myrstoun (1664)
Sir Alexander Maculloch, 1st Baronet (died 1675)
Sir Godfrey Maculloch, 2nd Baronet (died 1697)

References

Extinct baronetcies in the Baronetage of Nova Scotia
1664 establishments in Nova Scotia